These are the statistics for the 2009 FIFA Confederations Cup, an eight-team tournament running from 14 June 2009 through 28 June 2009. The tournament took place in South Africa.

Goalscorers
5 goals
 Luís Fabiano

3 goals
 Fernando Torres
 David Villa
 Clint Dempsey

2 goals

 Kaká
 Mohamed Zidan
 Katlego Mphela
 Bernard Parker
 Giuseppe Rossi
 Dani Güiza
 Landon Donovan

1 goal

 Dani Alves
 Felipe Melo
 Juan
 Lúcio
 Maicon
 Robinho
 Homos
 Mohamed Shawky
 Daniele De Rossi
 Xabi Alonso
 Cesc Fàbregas
 Fernando Llorente
 Jozy Altidore
 Michael Bradley
 Charlie Davies

Own goal
 Andrea Dossena (for Brazil)

Source: FIFA

Assists
3 assists

 Elano
 Maicon
 Mohamed Aboutrika
 Joan Capdevila

2 assists

 Kaká
 Tsepo Masilela
 Cesc Fàbregas
 Jonathan Spector

1 assist
Twelve players

Source: FIFA

Scoring

References

External links
2009 FIFA Confederations Cup at FIFA.com

Statistics